Pterostylis patens is a species of greenhood orchid endemic to New Zealand. Flowering have plants spreading leaves on the flowering stem and a single green and white flower with spreading, tapering lateral sepals.

Description
Pterostylis patens, commonly known as tutukiwi or greenhood, is a terrestrial, perennial, deciduous, herb with an underground tuber. Flowering plants have a single green flower with white stripes which is prominently inflated near its base. The dorsal sepal and petals are fused, forming a hood or "galea" over the column. The labellum is flat in cross-section gently curved and protrudes above the sinus between the lateral sepals. Flowering occurs from February to April.

Taxonomy and naming
Pterostylis patens was first formally described by William Colenso and the description was published in Transactions and Proceedings of the New Zealand Institute in 1886. The specific epithet (patens) is a Latin word meaning "open" or "exposed".

Distribution and habitat
This greenhood mostly grows in montane and subalpine forests, often of Nothofagus and in scrub. It is usually found in damp, shady places and occurs on the North Island south of Mount Pirongia and on the South and Stewart Islands.

Conservation
Pterostylis patens is classed as "not threatened".

References

patens
Orchids of New Zealand
Plants described in 1886